Kai Petri Suikkanen (born June 29, 1959) is a retired Finnish professional ice hockey left wing. Currently, he works as the head coach of Augsburger Panther of the Deutsche Eishockey Liga (DEL).

Playing career
 Suikkanen played in two games in the National Hockey League with the Buffalo Sabres, and spent most of his career in Finland's SM-liiga with Kärpät and TPS Turku.
 Two times Kanada-malja champion: 1980–81, 1990–91	
 Calder Cup champion, season 1982-83.

Coaching career
 Suikkanen Head coached Kajaanin Hokki as the champion of the Mestis (Second-highest league in Finland), during the season 2006–07.
 Suikkanen Head coached TPS as the champion of the SM-Liiga (top league in Finland), during the season 2009–10.
 Suikkanen worked as the head coach of Lokomotiv Yaroslavl during the 2010–11 KHL season. 
 Suikkanen Head coached HC Bozen-Bolzano as the champion of the Austrian Hockey League (EBEL league), during the season 2017–18.

International
Suikkanen won a silver medal at the 1988 Winter Olympics in Calgary as a member of the Finland men's national ice hockey team.

Career statistics

Regular season and playoffs

International

References

External links
 

1959 births
Living people
Buffalo Sabres players
Finnish ice hockey forwards
Ice hockey players at the 1988 Winter Olympics
Olympic ice hockey players of Finland
Olympic medalists in ice hockey
Olympic silver medalists for Finland
Oulun Kärpät players
People from Parkano
Rochester Americans players
HC TPS players
Medalists at the 1988 Winter Olympics
Undrafted National Hockey League players
Sportspeople from Pirkanmaa